Touch is the debut album by Canadian singer-songwriter Sarah McLachlan, released in 1988 and then re-released in 1989.

The album was originally released in 1988 by Nettwerk. McLachlan later signed to Arista Records internationally (although remaining on Nettwerk in Canada), and a revamped version of Touch, with several remixed songs and a new track, was released in 1989 on both labels. The original 1988 release was discontinued by Nettwerk, and is now considered a collector's item. It is distinguished by its black and sepia cover. The first released single from the album was "Vox" in 1988, followed by "Steaming" in 1989.

McLachlan did not achieve commercial stardom until 1991 in Canada, with Solace, and 1994–1995 internationally, with her 1993 album Fumbling Towards Ecstasy. In 1993, McLachlan and Nettwerk were sued by Darryl Neudorf, a Vancouver musician and former member of 54-40, who alleged that he had made a significant and uncredited contribution to the songwriting on Touch. Although both McLachlan and Nettwerk acknowledged that Neudorf was involved in the album's production, both took the position that his contribution had not been primarily in songwriting. The judge in that suit ultimately ruled in McLachlan's favor.

Track listing

1 Not all versions of the original 1988 release contained these two tracks.

Two 12-inch singles were released from the original 1988 album, each containing one of the alternate mixes that were on some, but not all, versions of the album release. The remix of "Vox" here is not the same remix that was on the 1989 album release.

Personnel
Sarah McLachlan – vocals, 12-string and classical guitars, piano, keyboards
Stephen Nikleva – electric guitar
David Kershaw – bass guitar, double bass, backing vocals
Jeff Krosse (aka Jeff Sawatzky) – bass guitar, backing vocals
Naomi McLeod – backing vocals
Greg Reely – drums, percussion
Darren Phillips – drums, percussion, keyboards
Ross Hales – drums
Sherri Leigh (aka Sherri Iwaschuk) – percussion
Tippi – percussion
Steve – percussion
Rudy – percussion

Charts

The RPM Albums Chart between October 1988 and April 1989 is not available. The Touch peak position is taken from May 1989.

Certifications and sales

References 

1988 debut albums
Sarah McLachlan albums
Nettwerk Records albums
Arista Records albums
Albums produced by Greg Reely